Cormons is a railway station serving the town of Cormons, in the region of Friuli-Venezia Giulia, northern Italy. The station is located on the Udine–Trieste railway. The train services are operated by Trenitalia.

History
The station should have been located on the Cormons-Redipuglia railway, however construction of the line never finished and therefore trains never ran on this line. Until 1918 it was one of the last Austro Hungarian stations before the border with Italy, the latter ran along Iudrio River. Its Habsburg heritage is visible by the building style.

Train services
The station is served by the following service(s):

Express services (Regionale Veloce) Venice - Gorizia - Udine - Treviso - Trieste
Regional services (Treno regionale) Venice - Gorizia - Udine - Treviso - Trieste

See also

History of rail transport in Italy
List of railway stations in Friuli-Venezia Giulia
Rail transport in Italy
Railway stations in Italy

References

 This article is based upon a translation of the Italian language version as of January 2016.

External links

Railway stations in Friuli-Venezia Giulia